Herrington is an area in the south of Sunderland, lying within historic County Durham in North East England.

The Herringtons are split into East & Middle and West and New villages. East and Middle Herrington is now a largely residential area just off the A690. West and New Herrington are across the A19 road from East and Middle Herrington near Doxford International Business Park.

History
The land was claimed by the Monks of St Cuthbert and belonged to the possessions of the Bishoprics of Lindisfarne and later Durham. For centuries, dating back as far as 1200, the villages were small farming communities. All the farms in the Herrington area were originally owned by the Lambton Estates, with the Lambton's mark (glazed earthenware ram's head) being displayed prominently on one of the buildings in each farm.

Herrington was expanded in the 1960s to include houses and the local school. This is when Herrington became a suburb of Sunderland. The houses were built by several private building firms working under one contract; one firm that was involved was Taylor's and Thompson's of Sunderland.

Herrington Hall
From at least Tudor times there was a Hall in Middle Herrington, occupied by a local family called Robinson. A long line of Robinsons lived here with property at Cleadon, Hetton-le-Hole, Whitburn and Houghton-le-Spring but their principal business interests became centred on the quayside at Southwick where they were maltsters. In the late 18th Century one Robinson married Robert Surtees, the great historian of the country; another married a son of the poet Robert Burns. The last to live there was Ralph Robinson but in 1795 it was sold to William Beckwith from Thurcroft,

The west park which was once part of the Herrington Hall estate is under review for development by Sunderland council for a modern housing complex. The local residents set up a group called save west park to combat the action of housing being built on old historic land once being part of Lord lambtons estate. They have a facebook page and website.

Herrington Country Park

In the 19th century, the Durham Coalfield began to take shape, and a number of collieries were established in the area, including one in New Herrington. Today, the former colliery site is the Herrington Country Park which plays host to the Durham County Show and the North East Motor Show. On 7 and 8 May 2005, Radio 1's Big Weekend was staged on the Herrington Country Park site. Notable artists who performed that year include Foo Fighters, Kasabian and The Black Eyed Peas. On 16 June 2012, the Olympic Torch came through the park and Blue Peter came live from the event.

Sport
The now-defunct football club Herrington Swifts were in existence in the early 20th century. Jack Middlemas, who played over 200 league games for York City, began his career with Swifts, as did James Bewick and Stanley Cowie.
Jordan Henderson born in East Herrington, now playing for Liverpool in the English premier league.

External links
The Herrington Heritage Group

City of Sunderland suburbs
Sunderland